Anderson Phillip (born 22 September 1996) is a Trinidadian cricketer. He made his international debut for the West Indies cricket team in March 2021.

Career
He made his first-class debut for Trinidad and Tobago in the 2016–17 Regional Four Day Competition on 17 March 2017. In November 2019, he was named in Trinidad and Tobago's squad for the 2019–20 Regional Super50 tournament. He made his List A debut on 7 November 2019, for Trinidad and Tobago in the 2019–20 Regional Super50 tournament.

In June 2020, Phillip was named as one of eleven reserve players in the West Indies' Test squad, for their series against England. The Test series was originally scheduled to start in May 2020, but was moved back to July 2020 due to the COVID-19 pandemic. In July 2020, he was named in the Trinbago Knight Riders squad for the 2020 Caribbean Premier League.

In March 2021, he was added to the West Indies' One Day International (ODI) squad for the series against Sri Lanka. He made his ODI debut for the West Indies on 14 March 2021, against Sri Lanka. In February 2022, Phillip was named in the West Indies' Test squad for their series against England. In June 2022, he was again named in the West Indies' Test squad, this time for their series against Bangladesh. He made his Test debut on 24 June 2022, for the West Indies against Bangladesh.

References

External links
 

1996 births
Living people
West Indies Test cricketers
West Indies One Day International cricketers
Trinidad and Tobago cricketers
Place of birth missing (living people)